Charles E. Knoblauch (March 9, 1922 – February 7, 1984) was an American politician and businessman.

Born in La Crosse, Wisconsin, Knoblauch graduated from Aquinas High School, in La Crosse, Wisconsin, and went to Michigan State University. He served in the United States Army Air Forces during World War II. He worked for the Carroll, Iowa Chamber of Commerce, before sitting in the Iowa House of Representatives as a Democrat from 1969 to 1973. In 1978, he and his wife moved to Fort Dodge, Iowa. He died of a stroke in a hospital there in 1984.

Notes

1922 births
1984 deaths
Politicians from Fort Dodge, Iowa
People from Carroll, Iowa
Politicians from La Crosse, Wisconsin
Aquinas High School (La Crosse, Wisconsin) alumni
Military personnel from Wisconsin
United States Army Air Forces personnel of World War II
Michigan State University alumni
Businesspeople from Iowa
Democratic Party members of the Iowa House of Representatives
20th-century American politicians
20th-century American businesspeople